Magic People was the debut album by the Canadian rock group The Paupers. It was produced by Rick Shorter and it made it to 178 on the U.S. charts.

Background
Prior to working with Rick Shorter on the album, the group's single "If I Call You By Some Name" bw "Copper Penny" was produced by him. He wrote the A side, which became a hit in Canada in January 1967. The single reached number 6 on Toronto’s CHUM chart with single sales reaching 35,000. This raised their profile, and after playing at the Café au Go Go, they attracted the right attention. An album deal was promptly done with the Verve record label. The group stayed in New York and went to Columbia Studios there to record some songs with Rick Shorter, which included "Magic People" and "Think I Care".  The finished product which was released on July 1, 1967 was produced and arranged by Rick Shorter with help from The Paupers and under the production supervision of Jerry Schoenbaum and John Court.

Release
Both mono and stereo versions of the album were released on vinyl in 1967. The album would peak at number 178 in the U.S. charts.

The album was released on CD in 2008 by Pacemaker with additional tracks.

Track listing
All songs written by Adam Mitchell and Skip Prokop.

Side A
"Magic People" -  2:43
"It's Your Mind" -  5:20
"Black Thank You Package" - 3:12 
"Let Me Be" - 3:10
"Think I Care" - 3:55

Side B
"One Rainy Day" - 2:20
"Tudor Impressions" - 4:13
"Simple Deed" - 2:43 
"My Love Hides Your View" - 3:20
"You And Me" - 2:40

Personnel
Adam Mitchell - lead vocals, rhythm guitar, organ on "You and Me"
Skip Prokop - drums, percussion, backing vocals
Chuck Beal - lead guitar
Dennis Gerrard - bass, backing vocals

The group biography which appears in the original sleeve notes mentions that "Skip [Prokop] and Adam [Mitchell] do the lead singing"; while Prokop indeed performed occasional lead vocals for the group, all the lead vocals on Magic People were performed by Mitchell.

Singles

References

External Links
 

1967 debut albums
The Paupers albums
Verve Forecast Records albums